Grevillea glauca, commonly known as bushman's clothes peg, cobblers peg tree, beefwood tree, nut wood, nalgo, or kawoj in New Guinea, is a species of flowering plant in the family Proteaceae and is native to Papua New Guinea and north-eastern Queensland. It is an erect, spindly shrub or small tree with narrowly egg-shaped to elliptic leaves, and cylindrical clusters of cream-coloured to greenish-white flowers.

Description

Taxonomy
Grevillea glauca was first formally described in 1809 by Joseph Knight in On the cultivation of the plants belonging to the natural order of Proteeae, from an unpublished description by Joseph Banks and Daniel Solander of a plant discovered by Banks near the Endeavour River.

Distribution and habitat
Bushman's clothes peg grows in a range of habitats including forest and woodland and occurs in Queensland from Cape York to Jericho and in Papua New Guinea.

References

External links
Isolectotype of Grevillea glauca at the Royal Botanic Garden Edinburgh Herbarium

glauca
Flora of Papua New Guinea
Flora of Queensland
Proteales of Australia
Plants described in 1809